Leonardo Cozzando (1620 – 1702) was an Italian writer.

When he was 12, he joined the Servite Order; in 1690 he became Provincial of the Order. He wrote and published a number of erudite works on various subjects. His most relevant work was the Libraria bresciana, published in 1694.

Works

References 

1620 births
1702 deaths
17th-century Italian male writers
18th-century Italian male writers
Servites